Rita Hart (born May 5, 1956) is an American politician and retired educator who served as an Iowa State Senator from the 49th district from 2013 to 2019. She is a member of the Democratic Party. In the 2018 gubernatorial election, Hart ran for lieutenant governor of Iowa on the Democratic ticket, with running mate Fred Hubbell.

Hart was her party's nominee in the 2020 election for Iowa's 2nd congressional district. Hart's opponent, Republican physician Mariannette Miller-Meeks, was certified as the winner by six votes, one of the closest federal elections in U.S. history. Hart opted to bypass the Iowa state court system and contest the election via a petition with the House Administration Committee under the 1969 Federal Contested Elections Act, which sets forth procedures for contesting state election results directly through the House of Representatives. Speaker of the United States House of Representatives Nancy Pelosi provisionally seated Miller-Meeks on January 3, 2021, at the opening of the 117th Congress, pending the House's adjudication of Hart's petition to overturn the results of the race, but on March 31, 2021, Hart withdrew her challenge.

On January 29, 2023, Hart was elected to be the new chair of the Iowa Democratic Party.

Early life and education 
Hart was born in Charles City, Iowa. She earned an associate degree from North Iowa Area Community College, a Bachelor of Arts from the University of Northern Iowa, and a Master of Arts from the University of Iowa.

Career 
Before entering politics, Hart worked as a public school teacher at Bennett Community School in Bennett, Iowa, and in the Calamus–Wheatland Community School District. She and her husband also own and operate a farm.

Hart served on the Senate Agriculture, Economic Growth, Education, Local Government, and Veterans Affairs committees. She also served on the Economic Development Appropriations Subcommittee, as well as the International Relations Committee, the Local Government Mandates Study Committee, the Recycling Policy Study Committee, the Early Childhood Iowa State Board, the Economic Development Authority Board, the Human Rights Board, the Prevention of Disabilities Policy Council, and the Watershed Improvement Review Board.

On June 16, 2018, Fred Hubbell announced that Hart would join the Democratic ticket as the nominee for lieutenant governor in the 2018 Iowa gubernatorial election. Hubbell and Hart lost the election to Republican nominee Kim Reynolds.

2020 Iowa's 2nd congressional district election 

She was unopposed in the June 2 Democratic primary election, and the next day released a list of 20 Republicans who supported her campaign, one of a number of Democrats making similar announcements during the 2020 United States elections. She faced Republican state senator Mariannette Miller-Meeks in the November general election.

The 2020 election for Iowa's 2nd congressional district was the closest federal election in the U.S. that year, and possibly the closest congressional election in recent memory. On November 30, following a recount, the Iowa Board of Canvass voted 5-0 to certify Miller-Meeks as the winner by six votes (196,964 to 196,958). Hart challenged the results through a petition with the House Administration Committee under the 1969 Federal Contested Elections Act, which sets forth procedures for contesting state election results. Under the Constitution, each chamber of Congress is "the judge of the elections, returns and qualifications of its own members."

Hart's petition contends that the House should count certain ballots that were not included in the recount. In her petition she contended, without evidence, that 22 legally cast votes were not counted; had they been counted, she would have won the race by nine votes. House Speaker Nancy Pelosi provisionally seated Miller-Meeks on January 3, 2021, pending adjudication of Hart's petition.

In response to a letter containing questions from House Administration Committee Chair Zoe Lofgren, Hart and her attorney Marc Elias wrote, "Where necessary to effectuate the will of the voters of the Second Congressional District, the Committee should therefore exercise its discretion to depart from Iowa law, and adopt counting rules that 'disenfranchise the smallest possible number of voters.'" Republicans have sharply criticized Pelosi's decision to review the race in the House Administration Committee, calling it an attempt to steal the election. It has also been criticized by some Democrats, who argue it is hypocritical to overturn a certified state election after criticizing Republican attempts to overturn the results of the 2020 presidential election.

Personal life 
Hart and her husband, Paul, have five children. They reside in Wheatland, Iowa.

Electoral history

2012

2014

2020

References

External links

Member profile at the Iowa General Assembly
Rita Hart for Congress campaign website

1956 births
20th-century American educators
20th-century American women educators
21st-century American educators
21st-century American politicians
21st-century American women politicians
21st-century American women educators
Democratic Party Iowa state senators
Living people
Schoolteachers from Iowa
University of Northern Iowa alumni
University of Iowa alumni